Federal Route 261, or Jalan Lubok Jong-Tanah Merah (formerly Kelantan State Route D27), is a federal road in Kelantan, Malaysia. The road connects Lubok Jong in the north to Tanah Merah in the south.

History
In 2014, the highway was gazetted as Federal Route 261.

Features

List of junctions and towns

References

Malaysian Federal Roads